St Mary's Church is a redundant Anglican church in the village of Hartley Wintney, Hampshire, England. It is recorded in the National Heritage List for England as a designated Grade II* listed building, and is under the care of the Churches Conservation Trust.

History

The church was built in the 13th century by the nuns of Wintney Priory.  At this time it consisted of a nave and a chancel.  The transepts and the tower were added in the middle of the 19th century.  St Mary's was replaced as the parish church when a new church dedicated to Saint John was built in the village, and St Mary's became a mortuary chapel.  The church was declared redundant on 13 March 1974 and was vested in the Churches Conservation Trust on 22 October 1975.

Architecture

Exterior
The nave and chancel are constructed in flint with some puddingstone and brick. The transepts are in red brick, and the tower is in flint. The church is roofed with red tiles. Its plan consists of a nave and chancel, with north and south transepts, and a west tower. The windows in the sides of the chancel and nave date from the 14th and 15th centuries, and have one, two or three lights. The windows in the transepts, and the three-light east window, date from the 19th century. The tower is in three stages with diagonal corner buttresses. In the bottom stage is a west door, and a single-light window on the north and south sides. The middle stage contains two-light windows on the north, west and south sides, and in the top stage are three-light bell openings an all sides. At the top of the tower is an embattled parapet with a pinnacle at each corner.

Interior
In the chancel is a 12th-century piscina, and a hagioscope (squint). Also in the church are box pews, a communion rail dating from the early 18th century, hatchments, and a royal arms dated 1705. There are the remains of 13th-century wall paintings, including one depicting Saint Christopher, and another showing Saint George killing the dragon.

Burials
Henry Hawley, nicknamed "Hangman", who defeated Charles Edward Stuart ("Bonny Prince Charlie") at the Battle of Culloden
William Lethaby, architect
Alan Brooke, 1st Viscount Alanbrooke, Chief of the Imperial General Staff during the Second World War
Ambrose Heal
Robert Weir Schultz, Arts and Crafts architect

See also
List of churches preserved by the Churches Conservation Trust in South East England

References

Further reading

External links
Hampshire Churches Photographs of the interior

Grade II* listed churches in Hampshire
Church of England church buildings in Hampshire
English Gothic architecture in Hampshire
Gothic Revival architecture in Hampshire
Churches preserved by the Churches Conservation Trust
Flint buildings